John Schlimm (born December 1, 1971) is an American author, activist, artist, and educator.  His books include Five Years in Heaven: The Unlikely Friendship That Answered Life's Greatest Questions, The Ultimate Beer Lover's Happy Hour: Over 325 Recipes for Your Favorite Bar Snacks & Beer Cocktails, The Cheesy Vegan, Stand Up!: 75 Young Activists Who Rock the World, And How You Can, Too!, Grilling Vegan Style, and The Tipsy Vegan.

John's essays and other writings have been widely published, including as a regular contributor to HuffPost and as an "Architect of Change" for Maria Shriver.com.

Early years
John was born in St. Marys, Pennsylvania, a small city in Northwestern Pennsylvania, that was once called the "Carbon Capital of the World". He still resides there. The great-great-grandson of Straub Brewery Founder Peter Straub, he grew up immersed in the beer culture and within walking distance of his family's brewery.

Memoir: Five Years in Heaven
In 2015, John released his first memoir, Five Years in Heaven: The Unlikely Friendship That Answered Life’s Greatest Questions.

The book chronicles how at age thirty-one, lost and alone at a crucial crossroads in his life, John found Heaven on earth. On the grounds of a 150-year–old monastery, he met 87-year-old, artist and cloistered nun Sister Augustine, the wise and humble artist at the convent’s ceramic shop. Over the next five years, John visited Sister just about every week. Their hundreds of visits became a master class in the meaning of life, love, and starting over, with a lot of laughter along the way.

In 2016, Five Years in Heaven was honored with a Christopher Award.

Cookbooks
A member of the award-winning Straub Brewery family of Pennsylvania, one of the oldest and most historic brewing families in the United States dating back to the 1870s,  John called upon his family roots to write The Ultimate Beer Lover's Cookbook. With more than 400 food and drink recipes that all use beer as an ingredient, The Ultimate Beer Lover's Cookbook made history in 2008 as the largest beer cookbook ever published. In 2009, the Gourmand World Cookbook Awards named The Ultimate Beer Lover's Cookbook The Best Beer Book in the United States and The Best Beer Book in the World.  That same year, The Beer Lover's Cookbook was released as a smaller paperback adaptation of the original, with just over 300 food and drink recipes.

In August 2014, John's cookbook The Ultimate Beer Lover’s Happy Hour: Over 325 Recipes for Your Favorite Bar Snacks & Beer Cocktails debuted. It features bar bites – from Sizzling Sriracha Peanuts to Taproom Tacos to Blitzed Bean Soup – and beer cocktails, chuggers, shots, shooters, chasers, punches, floats, and shakes, with nearly 1,000 related pairing suggestions using today’s most popular craft and seasonal beer styles. 

John's other cookbooks include The Cheesy Vegan, Grilling Vegan Style, and The Tipsy Vegan.

THE SMILE THAT CHANGED THE WORLD (is yours)
On June 5, 2016, John's 18-foot long, participatory art piece titled THE SMILE THAT CHANGED THE WORLD (is yours) was installed at The Westmoreland Museum of American Art. Hundreds of attendees of all ages (2 to 87) and from all walks of life added their bright, inspiring smiles. THE SMILE was then exhibited in the Robertshaw Gallery at The Westmoreland through July 3, 2016.

The purpose of his SMILE piece is to visually remind the participants and viewers how they each make a difference in this world and how ultimately we are all interconnected.

THE SMILE originally debuted with installations in Canada and Washington, D.C.

THE SMILE piece will be installed and repeated in several upcoming cities and events, and eventually all the canvasses will one day be sewn together in an installation to form MILES OF OUR SMILES ACROSS THE WORLD.

Early writing
John's first published writing was a front-page feature article in his hometown newspaper, The Daily Press, about his family's 4th of July parade tradition. He chronicled how every July 4 his family celebrates the holiday with a private family parade at their woodland retreat. The tradition was started by his Great Uncle Frank Straub, who served as the family's Uncle Sam, almost fifty years ago.

Years later, while continuing to contribute feature articles to Autograph Collector Magazine (now Autograph magazine), in 1998, John became a contributing editor for the magazine and started writing more feature articles as well as a monthly column, "The Book Collector". Schlimm continued to serve as a contributing editor and book critic for the magazine until Fall 2010, writing about some of the world's biggest superstars and pop icons.

During this time, John wrote a column, "The Culture Collector", as well as features pieces about such notable public figures and celebrities as presidential candidates on the campaign trail during the New Hampshire primary, Monica Lewinsky, and artist Peter Max for the now defunct Pop Culture Collecting magazine.

Early career
During his early career in the 1990s, John served in the Vice Presidential Communications Office at The White House where he worked with Second Lady Tipper Gore as well as having worked in production and scriptwriting for the national radio series Enterprising Women, fundraising for various national and local non-profits, and country music PR at FrontPage Publicity in Nashville where he worked with Naomi Judd and other superstars.

In 2003, John joined the faculty at the University of Pittsburgh at Bradford as an adjunct professor in the Communication and the Arts Department, teaching courses in Public Relations, Communications, and writing. He hosted the radio program Campus Crossfire for five seasons. During the 2006-07 school year, Schlimm served as the Visiting Assistant Professor for Broadcast Communications.

In 2012, John returned to campus to deliver the Commencement Address. He has been a promotional writer for the country’s preeminent literary public relations firm and a leading publisher, where he has written on behalf of Hollywood and literary superstars as well as some of the country’s most respected brand names.

Community involvement
John's ongoing community-based efforts include co-directing the award-winning TEAM STRAUB (an adjunct fundraising arm of the Straub Brewery, Inc.), serving on the Board of Directors for both Citizens Against Physical, Sexual & Emotional Abuse (CAPSEA) and the Pennsylvania Humanities Council, volunteering with the Humane Society, and speaking at VegFests and other events across the country, among other activities.

In 2013, John delivered his keynote address titled "Embrace Compassion, Change the World" on Capitol Hill at the Congressional Vegetarian Staff Association luncheon.

Education
John graduated summa cum laude from Elk County Catholic High School in 1990.

Beginning his college career as a fashion design major at Marymount University in Arlington, Virginia, he later switched majors and graduated summa cum laude from the University with a bachelor's degree in communications/public relations and a minor in studio arts.

During the late 1990s, he returned to college at the University of Pittsburgh at Bradford, earning dual Secondary Education Certifications in English and Speech Communications.

In 2002, John graduated with a Master's in Education from Harvard University.

Bibliography
Extraordinary Dogs: Stories from Search and Rescue Dogs, Comfort Dogs, and Other Canine Heroes (with Liz Stavrinides), St. Martin's Press, 2019. 
Moonshine: A Celebration of America's Original Rebel Spirit, Citadel Press, 2018. 
Five Years in Heaven: The Unlikely Friendship That Answered Life's Greatest Questions, Image Books, 2015. .
The Ultimate Beer Lover's Happy Hour, Sourcebooks/Cumberland House, 2014. 
The Cheesy Vegan, DaCapo/Lifelong, 2013. 
Stand Up!: 75 Young Activists Who Rock the World, And How You Can, Too!, Publishing Syndicate, 2013. 
Grilling Vegan Style, DaCapo/Lifelong, 2012. 
The Tipsy Vegan, DaCapo/Lifelong, 2011. 
Twang: A Novel, Amazon Digital Services, 2011. 
Harrah's Entertainment Presents...The Seven Stars Cookbook, Chronicle Books, 2010. 
The Beer Lover's Cookbook, Sourcebooks, Inc./Cumberland House Publishing, 2009. 
The Ultimate Beer Lover's Cookbook, Cumberland House Publishing, 2008. 
Straub Brewery (Images of America: Pennsylvania), Arcadia Publishing, 2005. . Writing as John E. Schlimm II.
The Pennsylvania Celebrities Cookbook, Stohn Books, 2005. . Writing as John E. Schlimm II.
The Straub Beer Party Drinks Handbook, Stohn Books, 2004. . Writing as John E. Schlimm II.
The Straub Beer Cookbook, Stohn Books, 2003. . Writing as John E. Schlimm II.
Corresponding With History: The Art & Benefits of Collecting Autographs, ETC Publications, 1996. . Writing as John E. Schlimm II.

References

Living people
1971 births
Harvard Graduate School of Education alumni
University of Pittsburgh alumni
University of Pittsburgh faculty
American memoirists
American male non-fiction writers
People from St. Marys, Pennsylvania
Vegan cookbook writers